Eastern Michigan Eagles wrestling team was a men's athletic program at Eastern Michigan University. Based in Ypsilanti in the U.S. state of Michigan, the Eastern Michigan Eagles competed in NCAA Division I and were a member of Mid-American Conference .

History
Eastern Michigan adopted the sport of wrestling in 1956. The wrestling program was part of the National Association of Intercollegiate Athletics (NAIA) from 1957 through 1962. In 1963-1966, EMU wrestling switched conferences to the Presidents' Athletic Conference (PAC). Since the exit of the PAC conference, EMU has been a part of the Mid-American Conference (MAC), starting in 1973. In 1996, Eastern won its first Mid-American conference Championship under MAC Coach of the Year Willie Gadson. Eastern put six wrestlers in the finals and placed 8 of 10.

On March 20, 2018, EMU announced the elimination of wrestling and three other sports.

Home meets

Home meets were held in 8,824 seat EMU Convocation Center located on Eastern Michigan's campus in Ypsilanti, Michigan.  Since 1991, the university was an annual host of the EMU Open/EMU Duals with over 500 wrestlers and NCAA schools across all divisions.

Coaches

Head coach
The EMU wrestling team was coached by David Bolyard. David Bolyard took over the program from Derek DelPorto in 2014. David Bolyard attended Central Michigan University in 2000 and graduated from CMU. David Bolyard was an All-American his junior year, a four-time national qualifier, receive All-American honors, and broke a school record by winning 21 straight matches. David Bolyard was awarded the Chick Sherwood Award, which was presented to CMU's most valuable wrestler. David Bolyard ranked seventh all-time with 109 career wins and is tied for 10th with 22 falls in CMU history. David Bolyard was a 3x runner-up and a 2005 MAC champion at 165 lbs.  Davis Bolyard came to EMU in 2007 as an assistant coach, hired by former head coach, Derek DelPorto.

All-Americans

NAIA
Eliehue Brunson (1965) 6th, (1965) 6th
Bob Ray (1967) 2nd
Dale Kestel (1968)  5th
Larry Miele (1968)  3rd
Mike Weede  (1970) 5th
Tom Jackson (1970) 6th
Doug Willer (1971) 3rd

NCAA Division II
Tom Buckalew (1966)  4th
Bob Ray (1967) 5th (1966) 2nd
Mark Davids (1971) 2nd
Doug Willer (1972) 5th

NCAA Division I
Jerry Umin (1987) 7th
Joel Smith (1989) 5th
Lee Pritts (1996) 6th
Mike Feeney (1999) 8th
Sa'Derian Perry (2018) 8th

Mid-American Conference champions

1972-1990
1972-73 Doug Willer  142 lbs
1975-76 Rick Setzer  Hwt
1983-84 Steve Brown  118 lbs
1983-84 Robert Beck  126 lbs
1985-86 Steve Brown  118 lbs
1986-87 Jerry Umin   167 lbs
1987-88 Steve Brown  126 lbs
1987-88 Joel Smith   158 lbs
1987-88 Jerry Umin   167 lbs
1988-89 Doug Harper  118 lbs
1988-89 Brian Schneider  150 lbs
1988-89 Joel Smith   158 lbs
1989-90 Hugh Waddington  142 lbs

1991–present
1990-91 Tony Venturini   118 lbs
1991-92 Tony Venturini   118 lbs
1995-96 Lee Pritts   118 lbs
1995-96 Matt Turnbow 126 lbs
1995-96 Ramico Blackmon  150 lbs
1995-96 Jake Shulaw   158 lbs
1995-96 Nate Miklusak    167 lbs
2006-07 Jermain Thompson 149 lbs
2008-09 John McClure   197 lbs
2017-18 Kayne MacCallum   184 lbs

References

External links
 

 
1956 establishments in Michigan
Sports clubs established in 1956